Cooper Black is an ultra-bold serif typeface intended for display use that was designed by Oswald Bruce Cooper and released by the Barnhart Brothers & Spindler type foundry in 1922. The typeface was drawn as an extra-bold weight of Cooper's "Cooper Old Style" family. It rapidly became a standard typeface and was licensed by American Type Founders and also copied by many other manufacturers of printing systems.

Its use in pop culture increased worldwide since 1966, when the Beach Boys used it for the cover artwork of their album Pet Sounds. It was then featured in the Doors’ L.A. Woman (1971) and David Bowie’s Ziggy Stardust (1972), and in the opening credits of The Bob Newhart Show, Diff'rent Strokes, Garfield, M*A*S*H, Enos, The New Adventures of Winnie the Pooh, Everybody Hates Chris and other shows. The font is used for the Disney Sing-Along Songs from the intro. As a result, Cooper Black has become emblematic of late-1960s/early-1970s style. It is also known in railroading for its association with the Atchison, Topeka and Santa Fe Railway "Yellowbonnet" paint scheme, also dating to the early 1960s, which had "Santa Fe" in large yellow letters on locomotive sides.

Cooper Black followed on from Cooper's career as a lettering artist in Chicago and the Midwest of America in the 1920s. Cooper Black was advertised as being "for far-sighted printers with near-sighted customers", as well as "the Black Menace" by detractors. While very bold, Cooper Black is based on traditional "old-style" serif lettering, rather than the hard-edged "fat face" fonts popular in the nineteenth century, giving it a soft, 'muddy' appearance, with relatively low contrast between thick and thin strokes.

Cooper Hilite

Cooper Hilite is a version of Cooper Black originally designed by painting white relief impressions into a printed proof of Cooper Black. It has been digitized by ParaType and Wordshape.

Imitations and variants
Cooper Black was immediately popular and spawned imitations, including Goudy Heavy Face from Frederic Goudy, Ludlow Black and Pabst Extra Bold. Cooper Black remains popular: the editors of the typography discussion website Fonts in Use report more submissions of its use than any other face that is not a sans-serif, although outnumbered by Times New Roman once its many variants are added up.

Many unusual versions of Cooper were created in the phototypesetting period of the 1960s and 1970s, a period of explosion in production of display faces. These included "Ziptop Cooper Black" from Photo Lettering Inc., a version with the top bolder than the bottom, and other distorted variants.

Many digitisations of Cooper Black exist from companies including Bitstream, Adobe and others. Soap, designed by Ray Larabie of Typodermic, is a uni-case variant. A version from URW, which does not include an italic, is bundled with many Microsoft products. Cooper Old Style has been digitised by URW.

Miles Newlyn designed the New Kansas typeface, based on the Cooper Black typeface.

Gallery

See also
 Samples of display typefaces

References

Further reading
 Allan Haley. Typographic Milestones. John Wiley and Sons: September 1992. .
 Blackwell, Lewis. 20th Century Type. Yale University Press: 2004. .
 Fiedl, Frederich, Nicholas Ott and Bernard Stein. Typography: An Encyclopedic Survey of Type Design and Techniques Through History. Black Dog & Leventhal: 1998. .
 Jaspert, W. Pincus, W. Turner Berry and A.F. Johnson. The Encyclopedia of Type Faces. Blandford Press Lts.: 1953, 1983. .

External links
 Fonts in Use
 "Why this font is everywhere" on Vox

Display typefaces
Typefaces and fonts introduced in 1922
Letterpress typefaces
Photocomposition typefaces
Digital typefaces
Art Nouveau typefaces
Art Deco